Jaxartosaurus (meaning "Jaxartes lizard" after the early name of the Syr Darya) is a genus of hadrosaurid dinosaur similar to Corythosaurus which lived during the Late Cretaceous. Its fossils were found in Kazakhstan.

Description
Jaxartosaurus had a large crest that it may have used for visual identification, or to vocalize with members of the same species, as inferred for other lambeosaurines. They were likely herbivores, grazing on low-lying plants.

Taxonomy
The type species, J. aralensis, was first described by Anatoly Riabinin in 1937. A second species, J. fuyunensis, was described by Wu (1984) for a dentary from Xinjiang, China, but is dubious.

See also

 Timeline of hadrosaur research

References

Late Cretaceous dinosaurs of Asia
Lambeosaurines
Fossil taxa described in 1937
Ornithischian genera